Yuri Georgiyevich Shargin is a retired cosmonaut of the Russian Space Forces.

Biography 
He was born March 20, 1960, in Engels, Saratov Oblast, Russian SFSR. His father was Jewish. He is divorced and has two children.

Shargin graduated from the Military Engineering Academy for Aeronautics and Astronautics located in Leningrad. He is a lieutenant colonel in the Russian Space Forces.

He was selected as a cosmonaut on February 9, 1996.

He was selected in 2004, to be the flight engineer on the Soyuz TMA-5 mission to the International Space Station. 

Shargin was the first Russian Space Forces cosmonaut to launch into space. Due to his late addition to the crew and lack of background information or information about his activities in space, some questioned the motives of his flight. However, chief flight director Vladimir Solovyov, assured, “We, on the ISS, are not involved in military matters.”

After nearly 10 days in space, he returned to Earth on board Soyuz TMA-4

He retired from the cosmonaut corps in August 2008

References

External links 
Spacefacts biography of Yuri Shargin

1960 births
Living people
Russian cosmonauts
Russian aerospace engineers
Heroes of the Russian Federation
Russian Jews
People from Engels, Saratov Oblast